Hadley is an unincorporated community in Warren County, Kentucky, United States.

History

Geography
The community is also accessible from the Exit 7 interchange of Interstate 165 on the northwestern outskirts of Bowling Green.

Education
Students in Hadley attend Warren County Public Schools. In terms of high schools, Warren Central High School is the closest.

Media
Hadley, part of the Bowling Green media market, is the current home to the transmission tower of Kentucky Educational Television station WKGB-TV, NPR member radio station WKYU-FM, and NOAA Weather Radio station KIH45. 

From 1962 to 1971, Hadley was also the home to the transmission tower of commercial television station WLTV (channel 13, now WBKO). That station also maintained studios in the Hadley area for its entire stint as an independent station; the studios relocated to downtown Bowling Green after obtaining an affiliation with the American Broadcasting Company in March 1967.

References

Unincorporated communities in Warren County, Kentucky
Unincorporated communities in Kentucky